is a light novel with homoerotic themes written by Jinko Fuyuno and illustrated by Yamimaru Enjin, author of works such as The Way To Heaven and Voice or Noise. It was published by Frontier Works in Japanese, and was published in English by Digital Manga Publishing in May 2009.

Reception
Rachel Bentham, writing for Active Anime, enjoyed the building of the story and the lush illustrations. Patricia Beard, writing for Mania Entertainment, found Tsubaki difficult to relate to, as he is a "food-centric" character, and found the use of the phrase "Just relax" to signify anal sex to "sound odd". Michelle Smith, writing for Pop Culture Shock, appreciated that the characters were adults who thought about more things than just their romance, but found the language 'simplistic', with some 'cheesy lines'.

References

Digital Manga Publishing titles
Light novels
Yaoi light novels